Nicholas Constantine Metropolis (June 11, 1915 – October 17, 1999) was a Greek-American physicist.

Metropolis received his BSc (1937) and PhD in physics (1941, with Robert Mulliken) at the University of Chicago. Shortly afterwards, Robert Oppenheimer recruited him from Chicago, where he was collaborating with Enrico Fermi and Edward Teller on the first nuclear reactors, to the Los Alamos National Laboratory. 

He arrived in Los Alamos in April 1943, as a member of the original staff of fifty scientists. He came back to Los Alamos in 1948 to lead the group in the Theoretical Division that designed and built the MANIAC I computer in 1952 that was modeled on the IAS machine, and the MANIAC II in 1957.

After World War II

After World War II, he returned to the faculty of the University of Chicago as an assistant professor. He came back to Los Alamos in 1948 to lead the group in the Theoretical Division that designed and built the MANIAC I computer in 1952 that was modeled on the IAS machine, and the MANIAC II in 1957. (He chose the name MANIAC in the hope of stopping the rash of such acronyms for machine names, but may have, instead, only further stimulated such use.) (John von Neumann thought this acronym was too frivolous.)  From 1957 to 1965 he was Professor of Physics at the University of Chicago and was the founding Director of its Institute for Computer Research. In 1965 he returned to Los Alamos where he was made a Laboratory Senior Fellow in 1980.

Monte Carlo method
At Los Alamos in the late 1940s and early 1950s a group of researchers led by Metropolis, including John von Neumann and Stanislaw Ulam, developed the Monte Carlo method. This is a class of computational approaches that rely on repeated random sampling to compute their results, named in reference to Ulam's relative's love for the casinos of Monte Carlo. Metropolis was deeply involved in the very first use of the Monte Carlo method, rewiring the ENIAC computer to perform simulations of a nuclear core in 1948. In 1953 Metropolis co-authored the first paper on a technique that was central to the method now known as simulated annealing. This landmark paper showed the first numerical simulations of a liquid. The algorithm for generating samples from the Boltzmann distribution was later generalized by W.K. Hastings to become the Metropolis–Hastings algorithm. 

The key contribution of the Metropolis paper was the idea that

Associations and honors
Metropolis was a member of the American Academy of Arts and Sciences, the Society for Industrial and Applied Mathematics and the American Mathematical Society. In 1987 he became the first Los Alamos employee honored with the title "emeritus" by the University of California.  Metropolis was also awarded the Pioneer Medal by the Institute of Electrical and Electronics Engineers, and was a fellow of the American Physical Society.

The Nicholas Metropolis Award for Outstanding Doctoral Thesis Work in Computational Physics is awarded annually by the American Physical Society.

Acting career
Metropolis played the part of a scientist in the Woody Allen film Husbands and Wives (1992).

Personal life
Metropolis had a son, Christopher, and two daughters, Penelope and Katharine. He was an avid skier and tennis player until his mid-seventies. He died at a nursing home in Los Alamos, New Mexico.

Anecdotes
In his memoirs, Stanislaw Ulam remembers that a small group, including himself, Metropolis, Calkin, Konopinski, Kistiakowsky, Teller and von Neumann, spent several evenings at Los Alamos playing poker. They played for very small sums, but: "Metropolis once described what a triumph it was to win ten dollars from John von Neumann, author of a famous treatise on game theory. He then bought his book for five dollars and pasted the other five inside the cover as a symbol of his victory." In another passage of his book, Ulam describes Metropolis as "a Greek-American with a wonderful personality."

Erdős number
Metropolis has an Erdős number of 2 and he enabled Richard Feynman to have an Erdős number of 3.

See also
Stochastics
ENIAC
Colossus computer
Von Neumann paradox

References

External links

1993 Audio Interview with Nicholas Metropolis by Richard Rhodes Voices of the Manhattan Project
 Oral history interview with Nicholas C. Metropolis, Conducted by William Aspray at Charles Babbage Institute, University of Minnesota.  Metropolis, the first director of computing services at Los Alamos National Laboratory, discusses John von Neumann's work in computing. Most of the interview concerns activity at Los Alamos: how von Neumann came to consult at the laboratory; his scientific contacts there, including Metropolis, Robert Richtmyer, and Edward Teller; von Neumann's first hands-on experience with punched card equipment; his contributions to shock-fitting and the implosion problem; interactions between and comparisons of von Neumann and Enrico Fermi; and the development of Monte Carlo techniques. Other topics include: the relationship between Alan Turing and von Neumann; work on numerical methods for non-linear problems; and the ENIAC calculations done for Los Alamos.
 Francis Harlow and Nicolas Metropolis. Computing and Computers -- Weapons Simulation Leads to the Computer Era. Los Alamos Science No. 7, Page 132.
 Herbert Anderson. Metropolis, Monte Carlo and the MANIAC. Los Alamos Science No. 14, Page 69.

1915 births
1999 deaths
20th-century American mathematicians
American computer scientists
20th-century American physicists
Greek academics
Greek computer scientists
20th-century Greek mathematicians
20th-century Greek physicists
Los Alamos National Laboratory personnel
Manhattan Project people
Monte Carlo methodologists
University of Chicago alumni
University of Chicago faculty
Santa Fe Institute people
American people of Greek descent
Fellows of the American Physical Society
People from Chicago